The Political Constitution of the Republic of Chile of 1980 is the fundamental law in force in Chile. It was approved and promulgated under the military dictatorship headed by Augusto Pinochet, being ratified by the Chilean citizenry through a referendum on September 11, 1980, although being held under restrictions and without electoral registers. The constitutional text took effect, in a transitory regime, on March 11, 1981, and then entered into full force on March 11, 1990, with the return to electoral democracy. It was amended for the first time in 1989 (through a referendum), and afterward in 1991, 1994, 1997, each year from 1999 to 2001, 2003, each year from 2007 to 2015, and each year from 2017 to 2021, with the last three amendments concerning the constituent process of 2020 - 2022. In September 2005, under Ricardo Lagos's presidency, a large amendment of the Constitution was approved by parliamentarians, removing from the text some of the less democratic dispositions coming from Pinochet's regime, such as senators-for-life and appointed senators, as well as the armed forces' warranty of the democratic regime.

On November 15, 2019, following a series of popular protests in October 2019, a political agreement between parties with parliamentary representation called for a national referendum on the proposal of writing a new Constitution and on the mechanism to draft it. A plebiscite held on October 25, 2020, approved drafting a new fundamental charter, as well as choosing by popular vote delegates to a Constitutional Convention which was to fulfill this objective. The members of the convention were elected in May, 2021, and first convened on July 4, 2021.

Legitimacy

According to the law professor Camel Cazor Aliste, the Constitution of 1980 has problems of legitimacy stemming from two facts. First, the constitutional commission was not representative of the political spectrum of Chile: its members had been handpicked by the Pinochet dictatorship, and opponents of the regime had been deliberately excluded. Secondly, the constitution's approval was achieved by the government in a controversial and tightly controlled referendum in 1980. Campaigning for the referendum was irregular, with the government calling people to vote positively on the reform, and also using radio and television commercial spots, while the opposition urging people to vote negatively were only able of doing small public demonstrations, without access to television time and limited radio access. There was no electoral roll for this vote, as the register had been burned during the dictatorship. There were multiple cases of double voting, with at least 3000 CNI agents doing so.

Since the return to democracy, the constitution has been amended nearly 20 times.

A document from September 13, 1973, shows that Jaime Guzmán had by then already been tasked by the Junta to study the creation of a new constitution.

It has been argued the 1980 Constitution was designed to favor the election of right-wing legislative majorities. Several rounds of constitutional amendments have been enacted since 1989 to address this concern.

Replacement
In the summer of 2022, a proposed replacement constitution was submitted for national debate and general referendum, but it was rejected on September 5 despite having had the support of left-leaning President Gabriel Boric.

See also
 Chilean transition to democracy
 2021 Chilean Constitutional Convention election
 Constitutionalism

References

General references

External links

 
 
 
 Untying the knot (The Economist, Oct 21st 2004) 
 www.constitutionnet.org

+
1980 in Chilean law
Government of Chile